UDM may stand for:

Udmurt language (ISO 639 language code), a Uralic language
Union of Democratic Mineworkers, a trade union in Nottinghamshire, England
United Democratic Movement, a South African political party
United Democratic Movement (Kenya), a Kenyan political party
Universal Docking Module, a once-proposed portion of the International Space Station
Universidad de Manila, a university in Manila, Philippines
University of Detroit Mercy, a private Roman Catholic university in Detroit, Michigan
Upside-Down Magic, a fantasy book series by Sarah Mlynowski, Lauren Myracle, and Emily Jenkins
Upside-Down Magic (film), a Disney Channel film loosely based on the books

See also
 UdeM (disambiguation)
 DM (disambiguation) for micro-DM (μDM / uDM)